Porpentine is an archaic term for a porcupine.

Porpentine may also refer to:
Porpentine (game designer)
The Porpentine, an inn in William Shakespeare's play The Comedy of Errors
Porpentine, a fictional character in Thomas Pynchon's spy novella "Under the Rose"
The Porpentine, a magical jewel in Neil Gaiman's graphic novel The Sandman: A Game of You
Frederico the Porpentine, a fictional character in Dan Wickenden's children's fantasy novel The Amazing Vacation

See also
Porpentina Goldstein, fictional character in Fantastic Beasts and Where to Find Them (film)